Pedroni is an Italian surname. Notable people with the surname include:

Alessandro Pedroni (born 1971), Italian footballer
Angelo Pedroni (born 1943), Italian sprint canoeist
Franco Pedroni (1926–2001), Italian footballer and manager
Guido Pedroni (1883–1964), Italian footballer
José Pedroni (1899–1968), Argentine poet
Pierpaolo Pedroni (1964–2009), Italian rugby union player, referee and commentator
Pietro Pedroni (died 1803), Italian painter
Silvio Pedroni (1918–2003), Italian cyclist
Simone Pedroni, Italian classical pianist

Italian-language surnames
Surnames from given names